Haji Yusuf Iman Guled was a Somali politician.

Biography
Guled was raised in Somalia. He served as the newly independent country's Minister of Defence during the 1960s, and was a key figure in the nation's early civilian administration.

See also
Haji Bashir Ismail Yusuf
Osman Haji

Notes

References
Europa Publications Limited, The Middle East: a survey and directory of the countries of the Middle East, (Europa Publications., 1967)

External links
Somalia Government - May 1968

                   

Ethnic Somali people
Government ministers of Somalia